Jorge de León may refer to:

Jorge de León (baseball) (born 1987), Dominican baseball pitcher
Jorge de León (performance artist) (born 1976), Guatemalan performance artist
Jorge Díaz de León (born 1984), Mexican football goalkeeper